In mathematical physics, vanishing scalar invariant (VSI) spacetimes are Lorentzian manifolds with all polynomial curvature invariants of all orders vanishing.  Although the only Riemannian manifold with VSI property is flat space, the Lorentzian case admits nontrivial spacetimes with this property.  Distinguishing these VSI spacetimes from Minkowski spacetime requires comparing non-polynomial invariants or carrying out the full Cartan–Karlhede algorithm on non-scalar quantities.

All VSI spacetimes are Kundt spacetimes.  An example with this property in four dimensions is a pp-wave. VSI spacetimes however also contain some other four-dimensional Kundt spacetimes of Petrov type N and III.  VSI spacetimes in higher dimensions have similar properties as in the four-dimensional case.

References

Lorentzian manifolds